Zanobi Machiavelli (1418–1479) was an Italian painter and illuminator.

Machiavelli specialized in religious themed pieces. Some of his works reside at the National Gallery, London, and the Dunedin Public Art Gallery. He died in Pisa in 1479.

References

1418 births
1479 deaths
15th-century Italian painters
Italian male painters
Manuscript illuminators
Italian Renaissance painters